Tom Evans  (7 April 1903 – 1990) was a Welsh international footballer. He was part of the Wales national football team between 1926 and 1928, playing 4 matches. He played his first match on 30 October 1926 against Scotland and his last on 4 February 1928 against Ireland.

See also
 List of Wales international footballers (alphabetical)

References

External links
 
 

1903 births
Sportspeople from Rhondda Cynon Taf
Date of death missing
1990 deaths
Welsh footballers
Wales international footballers
Association football defenders
Leyton Orient F.C. players
Newcastle United F.C. players